The 2005–06 Barangay Ginebra Kings season was the 27th season of the franchise in the Philippine Basketball Association (PBA).

Key dates
August 14: The 2005 PBA Draft took place in Sta. Lucia East Grand Mall, Cainta, Rizal.

Draft picks

Roster

Fiesta Conference

Game log

|- bgcolor="#bbffbb" 
| 1
| October 5
| Coca Cola
| 89–81 
| Lampley (29)
| 
| 
| Araneta Coliseum
| 1–0
|- bgcolor="#edbebf" 
| 2
| October 9
| Sta.Lucia
| 88–92
| Lampley (25)
| 
| 
| Araneta Coliseum
| 1–1
|- bgcolor="#bbffbb" 
| 3
| October 14
| Red Bull
| 
| 
| 
| 
| Cuneta Astrodome
| 2–1
|- bgcolor="#edbebf" 
| 4
| October 19
| Alaska
| 72–102
| Lampley (17)
| 
| 
| Araneta Coliseum
| 2–2
|- bgcolor="#edbebf" 
| 5
| October 22
| Purefoods
| 78–84
| 
| 
| 
| Cagayan de Oro
| 2–3
|- bgcolor="#bbffbb" 
| 6
| October 26
| Talk 'N Text
| 100–94
| 
| 
| 
| Araneta Coliseum
| 3–3
|- bgcolor="#bbffbb" 
| 7
| October 30
| Sta.Lucia
| 96–89
| Lampley (27)
| 
| 
| Araneta Coliseum
| 4–3

|- bgcolor="#bbffbb" 
| 8
| November 2
| San Miguel
| 74–72
| Menk (20)
| 
| 
| Cuneta Astrodome
| 5–3
|- bgcolor="#bbffbb" 
| 9
| November 6
| Air21
| 93–83
| Menk (17)
| 
| 
| Araneta Coliseum
| 6–3
|- bgcolor="#edbebf" 
| 10
| November 11
| Red Bull
| 
| 
| 
| 
| Araneta Coliseum
| 6–4
|- bgcolor="#bbffbb" 
| 11
| November 16
| Purefoods
| 
| 
| 
| 
| Araneta Coliseum
| 7–4
|- bgcolor="#edbebf" 
| 12
| November 19
| Coca Cola
| 67–79
| 
| 
| 
| Lucena City
| 7–5

|- bgcolor="#edbebf" 
| 13
| December 10
| Air21
| 101–109
| Lampley (33)
| 
| 
| Ormoc City
| 7–6
|- bgcolor="#edbebf" 
| 14
| December 16
| San Miguel
| 78–86
| 
| 
| 
| Cuneta Astrodome
| 7–7
|- bgcolor="#bbffbb" 
| 15
| December 21
| Talk 'N Text
| 97–92
| Porter (31)
| 
| 
| Cuneta Astrodome
| 8–7
|- bgcolor="#bbffbb" 
| 16
| December 25
| Alaska
| 96–89
| Porter (29)
| 
| 
| Cuneta Astrodome
| 9–7

Transactions

Pre-season

Additions

References

Barangay Ginebra San Miguel seasons
B